Sigit Hermawan (born October 25, 1990) is an Indonesian professional footballer who currently plays for PSGC Ciamis on loan from Persib Bandung in the Liga Indonesia Premier Division.

Career

Persib Bandung
He made his debut for Persib Bandung against Persiba Balikpapan, playing seven minutes.

PSGC Ciamis
In January 2015, he was loaned to PSGC Ciamis from Persib Bandung.

Club statistics

Honours
Persib Bandung U-21
Winner
 Indonesia Super League U-21: 2009−10

Persib Bandung
Winner
 Indonesia Super League: 2014

References

External links

1990 births
Association football forwards
Living people
Sundanese people
People from Sumedang
Indonesian footballers
Liga 1 (Indonesia) players
Indonesian Premier Division players
Persib Bandung players
Persija Jakarta players
Indonesian Super League-winning players